David Morton Ramsay (12 May 1926 – 1983) was a Scottish footballer who played as a goalkeeper in the Scottish League for Queen's Park. He was capped by Scotland at amateur level.

References 

1926 births
1983 deaths
Scottish footballers
Scottish Football League players
Queen's Park F.C. players
Association football goalkeepers
Scotland amateur international footballers
Footballers from Glasgow
People educated at Shawlands Academy

Ashfield F.C. players